Microchilo kawabei is a moth in the family Crambidae. It was described by Inoue in 1989. It is found in Taiwan.

References

Diptychophorini
Moths described in 1989